Selinsgrove Area High School is a public school located in Selinsgrove, Snyder County, Pennsylvania. It is a part of the Selinsgrove Area School District. In 2015, the School enrollment was 789 students. It provides grades nine through twelve.The school serves a rural-suburban community of 22,259 residents according to the US Census 2013. SAHS is the sole high school operated by the Selinsgrove Area School District.

Student activities
The Selinsgrove Area School District offers a wide variety of activities, clubs and an extensive sports program.

Clubs and organizations
Selinsgrove's student life programs number in the twenties and include both national and local programs such as French Club, Technology Student Association, Forensics (of the National Forensic League), Chess club, FFA, Student Government, German Club, Key Club, SADD Club, Spanish Club, and Web Heads. Students from the school have been notably successful in participating in Pennsylvania History Day and the Pennsylvania Mock Trial Competition.

Theater
Students can also elect to participate on-stage in Selinsgrove's fall play, spring musical, and spring play. Notable productions in previous years include "The Little Shop of Horrors", "Annie Get Your Gun", Rodgers and Hammerstein's Cinderella, "Jesus Christ Superstar", "Footloose", "The Man That Came To Dinner", "Jekyll and Hyde", and "Copacabana". More recently, the school has performed shows such as "Beauty and the Beast," "The Canterville Ghost," and "It's a Wonderful Life."

Music and performance
The school's music program offers both band instrumental and voice training under a co-curricular policy. Co-curricular applies to those programs that are sponsored or approved by the Board and are conducted both during the regular school day as part of the approved curriculum and partly after the regular school day through approved performances and demonstrations.

Band
The Selinsgrove Area High School Marching Band supports the community by playing at local events like the annual Memorial Day ceremony and the Market Street Festival. Selinsgrove's band also performs each week at the school's football games; they perform in concert form at least once per semester. The band has played at Canadian football games and marched in several Disney World holiday parades.

Chorus
The Honors Chorus has performed at Carnegie Hall and at the dedication of the National World War II Memorial in Washington, D.C., as the representative of Pennsylvania. The 2005-2006 chorus premiered Matthew Harris' piece, "Oceanic Eyes" as well as "Magnificat" by John Rutter at Carnegie Hall, and again in 2009-2010 under the direction of choral director Mrs. Rachel Ulsh

Sports
Since 2000, the district has spent millions to add to its high school sports facilities. In a $2.5 million project, the high school stadium received a major renovation including the addition of plastic grass and a new track. A soccer field and field hockey field were developed in the lawn areas in the front of the high school building. A small portion of the development was paid for by team booster clubs. A new gymnasium was built as a part of the adjacent elementary school, to provide space for additional basketball programs.

In 2008, Selinsgrove School Board added its first club sport - lacrosse for both boys and girls, stipulating the teams would not receive taxpayer funded support. They are permitted to use the school's name in order to participate in PIAA events.

The district funds:

Boys
Baseball - AAA
Basketball - AAA (V, JV teams)
Bowling - AAAA
Cross country - AA
Football - AAA (V, JV teams)
Golf - AAA
Indoor track and field - AA
Soccer - AA
Tennis - AA
Track and field - AA
Wrestling - AAA

Girls
Basketball - AAA
Bowling - AAAA
Cross country - AA
Field hockey - AA
Golf - AAA
Soccer (Fall) - AA
Softball - AAA
Girls' tennis - AAA
Track and field - AA

According to PIAA directory July 2013

Alma mater
Selinsgrove's Alma Mater was written by Harold W. Follmer, Jr., Class of 1942.

Building
The current high school building was built in the 1930s through funding from the New Deal. The building was designed by Lawrie and Green architects of Harrisburg, PA. It is a concrete with steel framing construction, masonry walls and has a red brick exterior.

A two-story addition was added to the rear of the building that provides a media center, several technology labs, a four-office Guidance suite, as well as science and social studies classrooms. There is a cafeteria, a gymnasium with locker rooms, weight lifting rooms and secondary gym space. Parking is available on all four sides of the building. The Harold L. Bolig Memorial football field and Simon R. Rhoads Memorial Track are located behind the high school building.

References

https://www.dailyitem.com/applause/selinsgrove-students-to-stage-play-that-s-both-comedy-and/article_3a781d82-6c42-11e9-af30-7b0d93fab210.html
https://www.dailyitem.com/selinsgrove-musical-cast-and-crew/article_02699a40-736a-11e9-b2d5-833848b954ba.htm
https://www.dailyitem.com/fall-school-plays-preview-of-eight-valley-productions/article_c47f2cce-e2d0-11e8-a2f6-3325423947cb.html

External links
Selinsgrove Area School District
Selinsgrove Area School District report card
SUN Area Career and Technology Center
 Seals Den teaches skills for independent living
Pennsylvania Mock Trial Competition
National History Day in Pennsylvania
Selinsgrove Tolerance Troupe sends a message
Selinsgrove team strives to be smart about money

High schools in Central Pennsylvania
Public high schools in Pennsylvania
Schools in Snyder County, Pennsylvania
Educational institutions established in 1932
1932 establishments in Pennsylvania